The GTM Rossa is a Mini based 2+2 kit car designs and sold by GTM Cars and styled by automotive designer Richard Oakes.  The car was based on two front mini subframes attached to a central fibreglass monocoque, with the steering being locked on the rear subframe. The hard top roof was removeable and a soft top arrangement was available as an option from GTM. The Mark 1 car was produced from 1987 to 1990, and the Mark 2 car (which received restyled front and rear clamshells and can be distinguished by the use a Peugeot 205 rear light clusters) was produced beginning in 1990.

References

External links
Official GTMOC Forum

Kit cars
Rossa